Mohammad Davoudi may refer to:
 Mohammad Davoudi (screenwriter) (born 1989) Iranian screenwriter and director
 Mohammad Davoudi (cinematographer) (born 1959), Iranian cinematographer winner for Best Cinematography at the 16th Fajr International Film Festival